List of accidents and incidents involving military aircraft include all types of accident and incident, including mechanical failures, pilot error and military action. They include chronological lists, lists by conflict, lists by aircraft model and other lists. Losses due to military action during World War I and World War II are not included.

Chronological lists

 List of accidents and incidents involving military aircraft before 1925
 List of accidents and incidents involving military aircraft (1925–1934)
 List of accidents and incidents involving military aircraft (1935–1939)
 List of accidents and incidents involving military aircraft (1940–1942)
 List of accidents and incidents involving military aircraft (1943–1944)
 List of accidents and incidents involving military aircraft (1945–1949)
 List of accidents and incidents involving military aircraft (1950–1954)
 List of accidents and incidents involving military aircraft (1955–1959)
 List of accidents and incidents involving military aircraft (1960–1969)
 List of accidents and incidents involving military aircraft (1970–1974)
 List of accidents and incidents involving military aircraft (1975–1979)
 List of accidents and incidents involving military aircraft (1980–1989)
 List of accidents and incidents involving military aircraft (1990–1999)
 List of accidents and incidents involving military aircraft (2000–2009)
 List of accidents and incidents involving military aircraft (2010–2019)
 List of accidents and incidents involving military aircraft (2020–present)

By conflict

List of aviation accidents and incidents in the war in Afghanistan
List of Soviet aircraft losses during the Soviet–Afghan War
List of Russian aircraft losses in the Second Chechen War
List of aviation shootdowns and accidents during the Iraq War
List of aviation shootdowns and accidents during the Libyan Civil War (2011)
List of aviation shootdowns and accidents during the Syrian Civil War
List of aviation shootdowns and accidents during the Saudi Arabian-led intervention in Yemen
List of Ukrainian aircraft losses during the war in Donbas

By model

List of accidents and incidents involving the English Electric Lightning
List of F-15 losses
List of accidents and incidents involving the Grumman A-6 Intruder
List of Harrier family losses
Accidents and incidents involving the JAS 39 Gripen

Other
List of UAV-related incidents
List of fatal accidents and incidents involving Royal Air Force aircraft from 1945

Lists of aviation accidents and incidents